Fluoroethyl fluoroacetate is the fluoroacetate ester of 2-fluoroethanol. It is two times more toxic than methyl fluoroacetate.

See also
Methyl fluoroacetate
Fluoroacetic acid
Sodium fluoroacetate
Fluoroacetamide
2-Fluoroethanol

References

Convulsants
Fluoroacetates
Chemical weapons
Poisons
Fluoroethyl esters